Kinellar is a small but ancient human settlement in Aberdeenshire between Kintore and Dyce just off the A96.

It is said that the etymology appears to link to "Caen-ell-er", meaning "the end point of the great battle", reflecting the tradition of a bloody pursuit and defeat of an invading Danish force ending around Kinellar and supported by numerous burial mounds in the parish. However, this theory does not hold weight as the name Kinellar was only adopted in the early 19th century and the land was previously known as Glasgowego/Glasgoego.

The parish church lies on or close to a Druidic circle which is largely eradicated but two stones are incorporated in the churchyard wall. An ancient chapel stood in the centre of the circle and indicates an unbroken religious function for several millennia. An aerial photograph of 1978 placed the circle mainly south of the churchyard but intersecting with its south wall.

In pre-Reformation times the parish was linked to Kinkell and this link lasted until 1649. The old parish church has a font dated 1534 and the bell-tower was erected in 1615. This was replaced by a new church in 1801.

People from Kinellar
Alexander Robertson of Glasgowego three times Provost of Aberdeen
John Row (minister, born 1598)
Alexander F. I. Forbes (1879-1951) astronomer
John Gordon of Kinellar, noted Jacobite

Ministers of Note
see
Robert Forbes minister 1601 to 1605, dismissed when the General assembly discovered he did not know Latin
Walter Anderson MA minister 1606 to 1643 subscribed to the Covenant of 1638
John Mercer of London (1624-1676) minister 1651 to 1676, son-in-law of John Row
Rev Dr Gavin Mitchell DD (1731-1811) minister 1757 to 1811 (54 years) Clerk to the Synod from 1777
Robert Fiddes MA (1799-1889) minister 1833 to 1889 (56 years)

References

Villages in Aberdeenshire